Abdul Rashid (born February 15, 1979, in Khanewal) is a Pakistani sprint hurdler. Rashid represented Pakistan at the 2008 Summer Olympics in Beijing, where he competed for the men's 110 m hurdles. He ran in the third heat against seven other athletes, including Ronald Forbes of the Cayman Islands and three-time Olympian Dudley Dorival of Haiti. He finished the race only in last place by nearly two seconds behind Dorival, with a time of 14:52, twenty-eight hundredths of a second slower than his personal best of 14:24. Rashid, however, failed to advance into the quarterfinal round, as he placed fortieth overall, based on his time and performance in the preliminary heats.
He made a National record 7.95 s of Men's Indoor 60 m hurdles on 14 November 2005 Asian Indoor Games  Pattaya, Thailand 
He Win a Gold Medal 110 metre hurdles (14.33s) at the 2004 South Asian Games Jinnah Stadium in Islamabad, Pakistan
He Win a Bronze Medal 110 metre hurdles (14.62s) at the 2006 South Asian Games held at the Sugathadasa Stadium in Colombo, Sri Lanka.

References

External links
 
 NBC Olympics Profile

Living people
1979 births
Pakistani male hurdlers
Olympic athletes of Pakistan
Athletes (track and field) at the 2008 Summer Olympics
Athletes (track and field) at the 2002 Asian Games
Asian Games competitors for Pakistan
21st-century Pakistani people